Wesche is a surname. Notable people with the name include:

 Terje Wesche (born 1947), Norwegian sprint canoer
 Walter Wesché (1857–1910), British composer and entomologist
 Willy Wesche, German World War II oberst